Reed Duchscher (born July 13, 1989) is an American talent manager and investor. Duchscher is the CEO and Founder of Night Media,
and talent manager of YouTube personality MrBeast.

Early life
Duchscher grew up in Rugby, North Dakota and attended Rugby High School where he participated in track and  field, basketball, and football. After graduating from high school, Duchscher walked-on to play football at North Dakota State University.

Career
Duchscher started his career working as an NFL sports agent. He subsequently left to work for the YouTube channel Dude Perfect on brand deals and monetization strategies.
While working with Dude Perfect, in 2015 Duchscher started his own talent management company, Night Media. Night Media focuses on management, branding and business development for digital influencers. In 2018, Duchscher signed YouTube personality MrBeast to Night Media's roster. 
In 2021, Night Media launched a venture fund focused on investing in start-ups in consumer, gaming, and the passion economy.

Media
Duchscher spoke at TEDx NCState in 2020 about digital philanthropy.

He was named to Business Insider's list of "top talent managers of YouTube" in 2020.

Duchscher was included in Dallas Magazine's "500 Most Influential People in 2020".

In 2022, Duchscher was named to Business Insider's list of "22 top talent managers and agents working with YouTubers in building the future of the creator economy".

References

External links

1989 births
Living people
Talent managers